88 Nairobi Condominium is a 44-storey residential skyscraper  under construction in the Upper Hill neighbourhood of Nairobi, the capital and largest city of Kenya. When completed it is expected to become the tallest residential structure  in Sub Saharan Africa.

Location

Overview
The 88 Nairobi Condominium is owned by Lordship Africa, a real estate investment and development firm, based in Nairobi. The firm, is a subsidiary of the Lordship Group, a real estate conglomerate, headquartered in Central Europe.

Amenities
Other amenities include a convenience store, a 150-seat branded restaurant, Spa and Gym, Meeting and Business centre, Three resident Bars, Lavish Communal Lounge, a heated indoor swimming pool on the 31st floor, and parking space for 518 vehicles. There will be a total of 288 luxury condominiums in the development.

There are four apartment plans in the building: (a) the one-bedroom executive plan (b) the two-bedroom executive-plus plan  (c) Duplex, and (d) the penthouse plans, of three and four bedrooms, available on the 40th floor and above. All units will be fully furnished.

Target clientele
The target clientele is the estimated 40,000 executives and corporate employees working in the Upper Hill neighborhood, which lacked executive residential apartments, as of February 2018. 

The development would cut down on commute times and reduce the use of motorized transportation, as some executives might choose to walk to and from work.

Construction & Funding
The construction budget is set at KSh5 billion (approx. US$50 million), raised through, debt, equity, and unit sales. 

Construction kicked off in 2018, with completion approximated for 2023.

See also
List of tallest buildings in Nairobi
List of tallest buildings in Africa

References

External links

Buildings and structures in Nairobi
Residential buildings in Kenya
Nairobi